5-Methoxymethylone (also known as 2-A1MP and βk-MMDMA) is a chemical compound of the cathinone class which has been sold online as a designer drug. It is the beta-ketone version of 5-Methoxy-MDMA. The more common name 2-AIMP/2-A1MP does not appear to relate to the molecular structure. In comparison with methylone, the two compounds differ by the addition of a methoxy group at the 5th carbon atom of the aromatic ring. The toxicity of this compound is unknown.

Legal Status
5-Methoxymethylone is listed as an illegal drug under the name 2-A1MP in Hungary.

See also
 Lophophine
 5-Methylethylone
 5-Methyl-MDA

References

Substituted amphetamines
Cathinones
Entactogens and empathogens
Euphoriants
Benzodioxoles
Designer drugs
Serotonin-norepinephrine-dopamine releasing agents